Integrated Theatre Commands of the Indian Armed Forces are varying degrees of synergy and cross–service cooperation between the military wings of the Indian Armed Forces. Following Independence, in 1949 a joint educational framework was set up starting with the first tri-service academy in the world, the National Defence Academy, and over the years this joint educational framework has been expanded to bring officers from the different services together at different stages of their careers.

Jointness and integration is achieved through tri–service organisations such as the Integrated Defence Staff. The creation of the post of Chief of Defence Staff (CDS) in January 2020 was seen as a major push for the indigenous joint warfare and theaterisation process of the Indian Armed Forces. The recommendations of the Kargil Review Committee promoted increasing jointness and integration. Subsequent committees such as the Shekatkar Committee in 2016 included the creation of three integrated theatre commands. In February 2020, CDS Bipin Rawat said two to five theatre commands may be set up. The completion of the creation of theatre commands, both integrated and joint commands, will take a number of years. Indian Air Force opposed the formation of unified theatre commands citing limitation of resources.

India currently has service–specific commands system. However, joint and integrated commands, also known as unified commands; and further divided into theatre or functional commands, have been set up and more are proposed. The only fully functional theatre command is the Andaman and Nicobar Command set up in 2001 while the Strategic Forces Command, set up in 2003, is an integrated functional command or specified combatant command. Recently constructed integrated functional commands under the Integrated Defence Staff include the Defence Cyber Agency, Defence Space Agency and the Special Operations Division. The Air Defence Command is the first integrated command being undertaken.

There is and has been significant support as well as significant opposition to some of the attempts at jointness and integration, such as the theaterisation process, at the highest levels of government and the public.

History 

One of the earliest forms of jointness was the integration of infantry and cavalry. In the United States, during the Siege of Vicksburg in 1863, joint operations were seen in the actions of General Ulysses S. Grant and Admiral David D. Porter, who went on to leverage the combined power of the army and navy. The United Kingdom was the first country to have a Chiefs of Staff Committee in 1923. In the Second World War, General Douglas MacArthur and General Dwight D. Eisenhower were put in roles in which they commanded vast tri-service military operations. Despite the victory in the war major structural flaws were observed resulting in the creation of the Chairman, Joint Chiefs of Staff as the principal military adviser in the United States. In the United Kingdom, by the 1960s, the three military headquarters were integrated into the Ministry of Defence and the post of Chief of Defence Staff as the principal military adviser created. Over the years in both the United States and United Kingdom changes towards greater integration have been seen, for example the passage of the Goldwater–Nichols Act in 1986. France, Germany and Australia have also shifted to a more integrated defence management system. In Russia the creation of strategic commands was laid down in 2010 and soon after China followed with the 2015 People's Republic of China military reform and the creation of five theater commands.

Integrated Theatre Commands of the Indian Armed Forces 

Following Independence, India set up a Joint Services Wing, commissioned in 1949, to train cadets before they would go on for further training in their respective service institutions. By 1954, the Joint Services Wing would go on to become the National Defence Academy, the first tri-service academy in the world. The Defence Services Staff College was also converted to a fully integrated institution by 1950. In 1960 the National Defence College was commissioned and in 1970 the College of Defence Management. This joint educational framework that brought officers together at different stages of their careers has been beneficial in increasing inter-service camaraderie.

In his book, "My Years with the IAF", Air Chief Marshal (Retd) P. C. Lal wrote that, "The Bangladesh war demonstrated that the three Services working closely together were strong and decisive in their actions. Inter-Services cooperation was indeed the most important lesson of that war." However Air Marshal Vinod Patney pointed out that one of India's first experiences with jointness did not work out so well. He writes that India had attempted to try out a Theatre Commander during the initial stages of the Indian intervention in the Sri Lankan Civil War with the deployment of the Indian Peace Keeping Force. However, after helicopters were sent on missions without proper advice resulting in avoidable loss to life and machinery, air and naval assets were once again positioned under respective air and naval commanders. Under this structure, the operations continued till the end of the peacekeeping operations in 1990.

Following the Kargil War in 1999, the Kargil Review Committee was set up to review where India went wrong during the limited war with Pakistan and suggest changes to the security apparatus accordingly. Subsequently, a Group of Ministers was formed and in turn four task forces. Among the numerous recommendations suggested were "integration of the services both with each other and with the Ministry of Defence, the creation of a chief of defence staff and joint operational commands".

A Manohar Parrikar led Ministry of Defence appointed committee of experts, chaired by Lt General (retd) DB Shekatkar, submitted its report in December 2016. Among the recommendations of the Shekatkar Committee was the creation of three integrated theatre commands.

About 
The Department of Military Affairs under the Chief of Defence Staff has the mandate for the "Facilitation of restructuring of Military Commands for optimal utilisation of resources by bringing about jointness in operations, including through establishment of joint/theatre commands". India's CDS Bipin Rawat has said that India will find its own way of constructing its unified commands. Integrated Theatre Commands are allocated specific geographical theatres and can operate independently. In June 2020, Lt Gen (Dr) Prakash Menon wrote that "The main aim of Theatre Commands is to facilitate integrated planning and coordinated application".

Terminology 
According to the 2017 Joint Doctrine publication of the Headquarters Integrated Defence Staff:

According to the former Chief of India's Army Staff Deepak Kapoor, who recommended theatre commands as early as the 1980s, "integration is a step ahead of jointness in ensuring a synergised approach to operations". While in a joint command, the parent service remains part of the decision making process, in integrated commands, resources from the three services are already placed under one commander. In the case of an integrated command, the commander must be able to fully understand the workings of all the services under his command.

Implementation 
India currently has two fully functioning unified commands — the Andaman and Nicobar Command (ANC) set up in 2001 and the Strategic Forces Command (SFC) set up in 2003. While the ANC is an integrated theatre command SFC is an integrated functional command (or specified combatant command). There are currently 17 single service commands — 7 of the Army, 7 of the Air Force and 3 of the Navy. Each of these commands is located at a separate base.

As of 2020, the Air Defence Command is the first command being undertaken. Integrated commands set up as specialized service providers have also been formed: Defence Cyber Agency, Defence Space Agency and the Armed Forces Special Operations Division that are agencies of Integrated Defense Staff The Defence Cyber Agency could go on to form the Information Warfare Command. Other proposed commands include the Logistics Command and the Training and Doctrinal Command. The Integrated Defence Staff and the Defence Planning Committee are an integral part of the theaterisation process. In February 2020, General Bipin Rawat said two to five theatre commands are being looked into.

List of Integrated Theatre Commands

Critical commentary 
Air Chief Marshal S Krishnaswamy (Ret’d), the former Chief of Air Staff, wrote an article in The Indian Express titled, "Why theatre commands is an unnecessary idea" where he conveys that the idea of dividing India into "Theatre Command(s) may seemingly have some operational advantage" but "the permanency of dividing our own territory into Operational Theatres as a defence measure seems preposterous. And to state that such a division is required to defend our country more effectively sounds alarming." Air Marshal Narayan Menon writes that Integrated Theatre Commands work for United States, Russia and China is because militarily they are countries which are self-sufficient while "India is in a completely different and subordinate class" in terms of military expenditure and "shortages in personnel, equipment and firepower" in all three of the services. Maj Gen (Retd) SB Asthana notes that the idea of Integrated Theatre Commands in India "seems to be driven more by economic considerations and less by operational inadequacies".

Group Captain (Retd) Anant Bewoor opposes theaterisation for India stating that countries with Integrated Theatre Commands such as United States, Russia and China have different international expeditionary goals as compared to India. India neither has the forces for Integrated Commands, nor the geographical and strategic need nor the international expeditionary ambitions. He also points out that Pakistan, who do not have Integrated Theatre Commands, cause so much damage to India nevertheless. Air Commodore (Retd) Jasjit Singh also commented that theatre commands are generally used for foreign operations, and India has no need for such a force. Air Commodore Singh also argued that the specialisation that the current framework allows may be lost with unified commands and that if the services couldn't work together now, under the theatre process the situation may be worse.

See also 
 Exercise TROPEX
 Technical Support Division
Civilian control of the military
Civil–military relations

Notes

References 
Bibliography

Further reading 
 
 

Joint military units and formations of India
Military of India